Stigmatochromis modestus is a species of cichlid endemic to Lake Malawi where it lives among rocks.  It is an ambush predator, feeding on other fishes.  It can reach a length of  TL.  It can also be found in the aquarium trade.

References

modestus
Taxa named by Albert Günther
Taxonomy articles created by Polbot
Fish described in 1894